Grimaldi may refer to:

Rulers of Monaco
 House of Grimaldi, the princely family of Monaco
List of  Grimaldi family members
 Rainier Grimaldi, a French admiral

People
 Alberto Grimaldi (1925–2021), Italian film producer
 Anna Grimaldi (born 1997), New Zealand athlete
 Bernardino Grimaldi (1837–1897), Italian politician
 Carol Grimaldi (1938–2014), American restaurateur
 Dan Grimaldi (born 1952), Italian-American actor
 David Grimaldi (entomologist) (born 1957), American entomologist and curator
 David Grimaldi (politician) (born 1978), American politician
 David Grimaldi (soccer) (born 1954), retired American soccer defender
 Edevaldo Grimaldi (born 1984), Italian footballer
 Eva Grimaldi (born 1961), Italian actress and model
 Francesco Maria Grimaldi (1618–1663), Italian mathematician and physicist
 Giovanni Francesco Grimaldi (1606–1680), Italian architect and painter
 Jerónimo Grimaldi, 1st Duke of Grimaldi (1720–1789), Italian-Spanish politician
 Joseph Grimaldi (1778–1837), English clown
 Martina Grimaldi (born 1988), Italian swimmer
 Nicolò Grimaldi (1673–1732), Italian operatic singer
 Ralph Grimaldi (born 1943), American mathematician
 Rocco Grimaldi (born 1993), American hockey player
 Salvatore Grimaldi (born 1945), Swedish businessman of Italian origin

Arts and media
 Grimaldi (play), an 1855 play by Irish writer Dion Boucicault
 Grimaldi (film), a 1914 British silent film directed by Charles E. Vernon

Characters
 Amelia Grimaldi, a character in Giuseppe Verdi's opera Simon Boccanegra
 Damian Grimaldi, a character on the CBS daytime drama As the World Turns
 Carlo Grimaldi, a character in the video game Assassin's Creed II
 Giovanni and Eduardo Grimaldi, characters in the novel Never Say Die by Anthony Horowitz
 Lisa Grimaldi, a character in the soap opera As the World Turns
 Louis Grimaldi, a character in the television series Gossip Girl
 Luciano Eduardo Grimaldi, a character in the soap opera As the World Turns
 Vincent Grimaldi, a character in the Michael Connelly's crime novel Void Moon

Companies
 Grimaldi Group, a shipping company
 Grimaldi Industri AB, a Swedish holding company
 Grimaldi's Pizzeria, a pizzeria chain, based in New York City

Places
 Grimaldi, Calabria, a comune in the Province of Cosenza, Italy
 Grimaldi, a town near Ventimiglia, Italy
 Villa Grimaldi, a former detention and torture center of Chile's secret police DINA

Other uses
 Grimaldi (crater), a crater on the Moon
 Grimaldi Man, name given to an Italian find of two paleolithic skeletons
 Grimaldi Ministry, a Spanish government that existed between 1763 and 1777
 Grimaldi, part of the 1981 animated film Heavy Metal

See also
 Grimaldo (disambiguation)
 Grimoald (disambiguation)

Italian-language surnames